The Textile and Clothing Union (GTB) was a West German trade union representing textile and clothing workers.

The union was founded in 1949, and affiliated to the German Trade Union Confederation.  Its membership steadily declined, and by 1997, it had 183,349 members.  The following year, it merged into IG Metall.

Presidents
1949: Werner Bock
1963: Karl Buschmann
1978: Berthold Keller
1990: Willi Arens

References

German Trade Union Confederation
Textile and clothing trade unions
Trade unions established in 1949
Trade unions disestablished in 1998